The Rio 200 (initially Rio 400) was a CART Champ Car event held at Autódromo Internacional Nelson Piquet, in Rio de Janeiro.  The race was contested on the trapezoid speedway at the facility known as Emerson Fittipaldi Speedway.  The race was held from 1996 to 2000.  The first three events were run over 400 kilometers; the final two were 200 miles.

This event was the only South American race sanctioned by CART.  The IRL IndyCar Series began its 2010 season in Brazil with the São Paulo Indy 300, its first event outside of North America or Japan.  However, this event took place on a temporary street circuit in São Paulo rather than at a permanent facility like Jacarepaguá in Rio de Janeiro.

The 2001 race was canceled when the Rio municipal government missed a deadline for guaranteeing payment of sanctioning fees and failed to grant race promoter Fittipaldi access to the facility so he could begin preparations for the race. CART, later renamed Champ Car, never returned to Rio.

Race Winners

References

Champ Car races
1996 establishments in Brazil
2000 disestablishments in Brazil
Recurring sporting events established in 1996
Recurring sporting events disestablished in 2000